Jayadaman was a Western Kshatrapa ruler, although possibly only a Kshatrapa, rather than a Mahakshatrapa. He was the son of Chastana, and the father of Rudradaman I, but he may have pre-deceased Chastana, and never ruled as supreme ruler of the Western Kshatrapas. This is suggested by the fact that Chastana and Rudraman I are known from contemporary Indian inscriptions to have ruled jointly. 

His diminished title may also have been a consequence of the conquests of the Satavahanas over Kshatrapa territory.

The coins of Jayadaman were rather crude, only made of copper and square in form.

Notes

Western Satraps
2nd-century Indian monarchs
People from Ujjain